Zaragon is the third album by English singer/songwriter/guitarist John Miles, first released in 1978 and reissued as CD in 2008.

Background 

The release of Zaragon followed an extremely successful period in the career of John Miles who, during 1976 and 1977, had enjoyed two hit albums (Rebel and Stranger in the City) and four successful singles. Decca remained Miles' record label in the UK but, for the US release, Arista Records paid $500,000 to buy out his contract with London Records. An advance of $500,000 made this into a million-dollar album before release.

Music

In a change of direction from his earlier material (most notably his signature single "Music"), Miles decided not to use orchestral backing on Zaragon. Miles played guitars, keyboards and synthesisers on the album, with Barry Black on drums and Bob Marshall on bass.

The opening track, "Overture", was a rock epic in which keyboards took the place of the orchestral backing on his earlier material. The track is notable for an outstanding guitar solo by Miles. The long, three-part "Nice Man Jack" – a song about Jack the Ripper – was the centrepiece of the album, whilst the title track was science fiction orientated.

Album and singles

Zaragon reached No. 43 in the UK charts, a respectable showing given that musical fashions were moving away from "epic-rock" towards punk and disco. The album was not released on CD until March 2008, thirty years after Zaragon first appeared.

The only single release in the UK was "No Hard Feelings" which the New Musical Express described as "an agreeable ballad". The B-side of the single was "Mitre Square", the second part of the "Nice Man Jack" trilogy. In Spain, the order was reversed, with "Mitre Square" the A-side.

Track listing
All songs written by Bob Marshall and John Miles

"Overture" 8:15
"Borderline" 4:56
"I Have Never Been in Love Before" 5:07
"No Hard Feelings" 3:22
"Plain Jane" 8:09
"Nice Man Jack": – 7:45
"Kensington Gardens"
"Mitre Square"
"Harley Street"
"Zaragon" 5:31

Bonus track on the 2008 reissue

"Nice Man Jack" (single edit) 3:20

Personnel
John Miles - vocals, guitar, keyboards, special effects
Bob Marshall - electric bass
Barry Black - drums, percussion
Technical
Rob Freeman - engineer
Hipgnosis - photography

References

1978 albums
John Miles (musician) albums
Decca Records albums
Albums with cover art by Hipgnosis